Charles René Pierre (Charly) Luske-Jess (born 19 September 1978) is a Dutch singer, actor, television presenter and voice actor.

Career 

He played the role of Ray in several episodes of the soap opera Goede tijden, slechte tijden, the role of Piet Schuringa in Meiden van de Wit and the role of Peter in the youth television series Zoop. He played the role of Judas Iscariot in the 2012 edition of The Passion, a Dutch Passion Play held every Maundy Thursday since 2011.

He also participated in season 2 of The Voice of Holland where he was eliminated in the semifinals.
He participated in the 2004 edition of the Nationaal Songfestival, an annual competition held almost every year between 1956 and 2012 to select the country's representative for the Eurovision Song Contest. He finished in 4th place.

In 2012, he appeared in an episode of the television game show De Jongens tegen de Meisjes. In that same year, he also played the role of Glenn in the film K3 Bengeltjes.

In 2013, he participated in the fifth season of the television show Beste Zangers.

Personal life 

Luske is married to Dutch actress Tanja Jess and they have two children. He is a nephew of Dutch professional poker player Marcel Lüske.

Filmography

As actor 

 Goede tijden, slechte tijden (2000, 2001)
 Meiden van de Wit (2002, 2003)
 Zoop (2004)
 K3 Bengeltjes (2012)

As contestant 

 De Jongens tegen de Meisjes (2012)
 De beste zangers van Nederland (2013)

As himself 

 Groeten uit 19xx (2018)
 Een goed stel hersens (2018)

References

External links 

 

1978 births
Living people
Dutch television presenters
Dutch male singers
Dutch male stage actors
Dutch male voice actors
21st-century Dutch male actors
Mass media people from Amsterdam